Baron Brabazon may refer to:

Brabazon baronets, a title in the peerage of Ireland
Baron Brabazon of Tara, a title in the peerage of the U.K.